Elk City is an unincorporated community in Douglas County, Nebraska, United States.

History
A post office was established at Elk City in 1884, and remained in operation until it was discontinued in 1966. Elk City School was built in 1931.

References

Unincorporated communities in Douglas County, Nebraska
Unincorporated communities in Nebraska